St. Jones Within is located in Trinity Bay, Newfoundland. It takes approximately two hours to drive there from the province's capital city, St. John's. Its geographical location is: Latitude 480300 and Longitude 534500. Most of the houses in the community are built around the sheltered harbour.

Population 

St. Jones Within has a current population of about 110 people. 
See: 1921 Census, 1935 Census, 1945 Census, and Cemetery Data.

Religion 

St. Jones Within has one United church. The minister lives in the nearby community of Hillview.

Transportation 

Travel to St. Jones Within can be via the Trans-Canada Highway at the Hillview exit, or by boat via Southwest Arm, Trinity Bay.

References 

Populated places in Newfoundland and Labrador